Cameron Terry Coxe (born 18 December 1998) is a Welsh professional footballer who plays as a defender for Boreham Wood.

Early life
Coxe was born in Merthyr Tydfil and attended Afon Taf High School.

Club career

Cardiff City
Coxe began his career at Cardiff City, joining the club's youth academy at the age of seven before signing his first professional contract in February 2017. He made his professional debut during a 2–1 defeat against Burton Albion in the second round of the EFL Cup on 22 August 2017. However, Coxe did not feature for the first team for another two years. He appeared in two FA Cup fixtures under new manager Neil Harris in January 2020, but was later released at the end of the 2019–20 season.

Solihull Moors
In August 2020, Coxe signed for National League side Solihull Moors.

Colchester United (loan)
On 2 July 2021, Coxe joined League Two side Colchester United on loan until January 2022. He made his debut in Colchester's 0–0 draw away at Carlisle United on 7 August 2021.

Colchester United
On 7 January 2022, Coxe signed a permanent deal with Colchester United.

Boreham Wood
On 13 October 2022, Coxe returned to the National League when he joined Boreham Wood on a short-term loan deal.

On 30 December 2022, Boreham Wood confirmed the permanent signing of Coxe for an undisclosed fee on a two-and-a-half year deal.

International career
Coxe has represented Wales at under-19 level. In May 2017, Coxe was named in the Wales under-20 squad for the 2017 Toulon Tournament. After making his debut for the side in the tournament opener against Ivory Coast, Coxe was named in the starting line-up in Wales' second group match against France but was left out of the final game against Bahrain as Wales were eliminated in the group stage.

Coxe made his debut for the under-21 side on 1 September 2017 in a 3–0 victory over Switzerland. He was named in a preliminary senior Wales squad in May 2018 for a friendly against Mexico but was left out of the final selection.

Career statistics

References

External links

1998 births
Living people
Footballers from Merthyr Tydfil
Welsh footballers
Wales youth international footballers
Association football defenders
Cardiff City F.C. players
Solihull Moors F.C. players
Colchester United F.C. players
Boreham Wood F.C. players
English Football League players
National League (English football) players
Wales under-21 international footballers